Expo 2020 is a rapid transit station on the Route 2020 branch of the Red Line of the Dubai Metro in Dubai, United Arab Emirates.

The metro station opened on 1 June 2021 as part of Route 2020, created to link central Dubai to the Expo 2020 exhibition site. The schedule was delayed due to the COVID-19 pandemic in the United Arab Emirates.

The travel time between Centrepoint metro station at the northern terminus of the Red Line and the Expo 2020 station is reported to be 1 hour 14 minutes with a service frequency of 2 minutes and 38 seconds during peak times (24 trains per hour in each direction), and a capacity of 16,000 passengers per hour in each direction.

The station is located to the northeast of the Expo 2020 site, with direct access to the main entrance leading to the Al Wasl Plaza. It is the final station on Route 2020, although there are plans to extend the line to Al Maktoum International Airport to the south. In the meantime, a bus service operates between Expo 2020 and the airport.

After the Expo's six month run, the station will be renamed as Expo City Dubai, after the planned development for the Expo site.

References

Railway stations in the United Arab Emirates opened in 2021
Dubai Metro stations
Expo 2020